Rudolf Franz (born 22 October 1937) is a German former  cyclist. He competed in the team pursuit at the 1968 Summer Olympics.

References

External links
 

1937 births
Living people
East German male cyclists
Olympic cyclists of East Germany
Cyclists at the 1968 Summer Olympics
People from Wałbrzych
People from the Province of Silesia
Cyclists from Saxony
People from Bezirk Karl-Marx-Stadt